The year 2010 saw a number of notable events in worldwide spaceflight activities. These included the first test flight of the SpaceX Dragon commercial resupply spacecraft, which is intended to resupply the International Space Station (ISS), and the maiden flights of the Falcon 9 and Minotaur IV rockets. In June 2010, South Korea conducted a second Naro-1 launch, after the failure of the rocket's maiden flight in 2009; however, the second attempt also failed. The Kosmos-3M was retired from service, making its final flight in April. The Molniya-M was also retired from service, making its final flight in September.

Overview
The first suborbital launch of 2010 was conducted at 23:00 GMT on 10 January, when a Black Brant IX sounding rocket was launched as a target for the Boeing YAL-1 airborne-laser platform. On 11 January, China conducted an ABM test, involving two missiles. The first orbital launch occurred at 16:12 UTC on 16 January, when a Long March 3C launched the Compass-G1 navigation satellite from the Xichang Satellite Launch Centre.

Seventy-four orbital launches were attempted in 2010, with seventy being successful and four ending in failure. The last orbital launch was made on 29 December, when an Ariane 5ECA launched the Hispasat-1E and Koreasat 6 spacecraft from Guiana Space Centre, near Kourou.

Space exploration
Akatsuki, the first Japanese mission to Venus, was launched on an H-IIA carrier rocket in May.  It is intended to look for lightning and volcanoes on Venus. Despite a successful launch, the spacecraft failed to enter Cytherocentric orbit in December, but it managed to enter the orbit around Venus five years later in December 2015. IKAROS, the first operational solar sail, was launched on the same rocket as Akatsuki.

The first Japanese asteroid probe, Hayabusa, returned to Earth on 13 June, having landed on 25143 Itokawa in an effort to collect samples. It was also the world's first successful sample return mission from an asteroid.

On 1 October at 10:59:57 UTC, China successfully launched the Chang'e-2 spacecraft, the nation's second mission to explore the Moon. A Long March 3C rocket was used for the launch, which occurred from the Xichang Satellite Launch Centre. The spacecraft conducted a mission similar to that of the earlier Chang'e-1 spacecraft, but with a focus on mapping potential landing sites in preparation for the Chang'e-3 uncrewed lunar lander.

Crewed spaceflight
Seven crewed launches were planned for 2010, with three Space Shuttle missions and four Soyuz flights for International Space Station (ISS) crew rotation. STS-130, using orbiter Endeavour, was the first crewed flight of the year, launching on 8 February with the Tranquility node and Cupola for the ISS. On 5 April, Discovery launched on mission STS-131, with the Leonardo MPLM to resupply the outpost.

Soyuz TMA-18 launched the Expedition 23 crew to the ISS on 2 April; it was scheduled to spend around six months docked to the station to facilitate crew escape in an emergency. Shortly before, Soyuz TMA-16 undocked, transporting former ISS crewmembers back to Earth. On 14 May, Space Shuttle Atlantis launched on its second-to-last flight, STS-132, carrying the Rassvet module to the ISS. Soyuz TMA-19 launched with Expedition 24 on 15 June. Soyuz TMA-01M, the first flight of a modernised Soyuz-TMA spacecraft, launched on 8 October with the Expedition 25 crew for the ISS. Then, to end the year, Expedition 26 launched aboard Soyuz TMA-20 on 15 December.

Launch failures
Four orbital launch failures occurred in 2010, two affecting Geosynchronous Satellite Launch Vehicles, one affecting a Naro-1 rocket, and one affecting a Proton rocket. The first occurred on 15 April, when the GSLV Mk.II launched on its maiden flight. The rocket's third stage malfunctioned, resulting in the stage, and the GSAT-4 satellite, failing to achieve orbit and falling into the sea. The second failure occurred during the second launch of the Naro-1 rocket, carrying the STSAT-2B spacecraft. The rocket exploded 137 seconds into the flight.

The third failure occurred on 5 December, when a Proton-M with the first Blok DM-03 upper stage failed to inject three Glonass-M satellites into orbit. Before launch, the Blok DM was fuelled incorrectly, resulting in the rocket being too heavy to reach its parking orbit. The fourth failure occurred on 25 December 2010, when a GSLV Mk.I exploded during the launch of GSAT-5P. The rocket was destroyed by range safety, after control of the liquid-fuelled boosters attached to the first stage was lost.

Orbital launches

|colspan=8 style="background:white;"|

January
|-

|colspan=8 style="background:white;"|

February
|-

|colspan=8 style="background:white;"|

March
|-

|colspan=8 style="background:white;"|

April
|-

|colspan=8 style="background:white;"|

May
|-

|colspan=8 style="background:white;"|

June
|-

|colspan=8 style="background:white;"|

July
|-

|colspan=8 style="background:white;"|

August
|-

|colspan=8 style="background:white;"|

September
|-

|colspan=8 style="background:white;"|

October
|-

|colspan=8 style="background:white;"|

November
|-

|colspan=8 style="background:white;"|

December
|-

|}

Suborbital flights 

|}

Deep space rendezvous 

Distant, non-targeted flybys of Dione, Enceladus, Mimas, Rhea, Tethys and Titan by Cassini will occur throughout the first half of the year.

EVAs

Orbital launch statistics

By country 
For the purposes of this section, the yearly tally of orbital launches by country assigns each flight to the country of origin of the rocket, not to the launch services provider or the spaceport. For example, Dnepr rockets are counted under Ukraine even though they are launched from Russia.

By rocket

By family

By type

By configuration

By spaceport

By orbit

References

Footnotes

 
Spaceflight by year